Shogo Saitoh (斉藤 彰吾, born May 14, 1989 in Kasukabe, Saitama) is a Japanese professional baseball outfielder for the Saitama Seibu Lions in Japan's Nippon Professional Baseball.

External links

NPB.com

1989 births
Living people
Baseball people from Saitama Prefecture
Japanese baseball players
Nippon Professional Baseball outfielders
Saitama Seibu Lions players